Ivan Alexandrovich Ilyin or Il'in (Ива́н Алекса́ндрович Ильи́н,  – 21 December 1954) was a Russian jurist, religious and political philosopher, publicist, orator, and conservative monarchist. He perceived the February Revolution as a "temporary disorder", and the October Revolution as a "national catastrophe", and actively joined the struggle against the Bolshevik regime. He became a white émigré journalist, a Slavophile and an ideologue of the Russian All-Military Union which believed that force was the only means by which the Soviet regime could be toppled. 

As an anti-communist,
Ilyin initially defended Hitler, but his critique of totalitarianism was not at all appreciated by the Nazi regime. Moreover, in 1934 he refused to accept their orders to spread Nazi propaganda in the Russian Academic Institute and was subsequently removed from his post and banned from all further employment. While Ilyin lost his main source of income, Sergei Rachmaninoff helped him financially to stay in Switzerland in 1938. As Ilyin was not allowed to work or to be politically active, he mostly studied aesthetic, ethical and psychological questions.

Ivan Ilyin, often sick, wrote over 40 books and hundreds of articles and pamphlets in Russian and German.  Almost all of his works are steeped in religion and related to Russia.  Ilyin did not belong to the group of followers of Vladimir Solovyov, who preached worldwide theocracy and with whom the Russian religious and philosophical Renaissance of the early 20th century is usually associated.   He called for a patriarchal form of rule for Russia, based on Orthodoxy and faith in the tsar (the autocrat, not the tyrant). Appeals to heroism and moral aristocratism appear throughout Ilyin's writings. He became the purveyor of the doctrine of Western Russophobia.

Ilyin remained a right Hegelian all his life, exploring the themes of the state, law, and power in world history.
Ilyin criticized individualism, rejected federalism, and neutrality, and was an enemy of  Western analytic philosophy.  The ultranationalist Ilyin was critical of Western-style democracy, emphasizing instead the importance of a strong government in accord with Russia's autocratic heritage. He predicted the collapse of the Soviet state. Ilyin's views on the social structure of Russia and world history had a great influence on post-Soviet intellectuals and politicians, including Aleksandr Solzhenitsyn, and Russian President Vladimir Putin.

Early life 

Ivan Ilyin was born in an aristocratic family claiming Rurikid descent. Ilyin's grandfather was a military man who moved to Moscow, where he became a civil engineer. His last job was as commandant of the Grand Kremlin Palace and gates. His father, Alexander Ivanovich Ilyin (1851-1921), was born and raised in the palace and a lawyer at the Moscow District Court.  Ilyin's mother, Caroline Louise née Schweikert (1858-1942), was of German Russian descent and confessing Lutheran. To be able to marry Alexander Ilyin in 1880 she converted to Russian Orthodoxy and took the name Yekaterina Yulyevna.

Ivan Ilyin was brought up in the center of Moscow in Khamovniki District. He graduated on the 1st Moscow Gymnasium in 1901 and entered the Law faculty of the Moscow State University but would rather have studied history. Ilyin wrote as well in German as in Russian and mastered Church Slavic. He studied Plato's Ideal State and Kant's Thing-in-itself. Ilyin became a political radical during his student days and supported the freedom of assembly. In 1904, he took part in a student march, was arrested, and spent a month in prison. The events of the First Russian Revolution and the October Manifesto were reflected in his pamphlets "Freedom of Assembly and popular Representation" (a way of public participation in politics), "What is a Political Party", "From Russian Antiquity: The Revolt of Stenka Razin". Ilyin produced them under the pseudonym "Nikolai Ivanov".

Under influence of Pavel Novgorodtsev Ilyin became interested in the philosophy of law. In 1906, Ilyin graduated and married Natalia Nikolaevna Vocach (1882-1963) in Bykovo. She was a translator, art-historian and niece of Sergei Muromtsev, a Kadet and chairman of the First Duma. Ilyin worked with  Natalia on a translation of "Anarchism" by Paul Eltzbacher and a treatise by J.J. Rousseau ("Idea of the General will") which were never published.  From 1909 he began working as a privatdozent. (In the same year Lenin published his Materialism and Empirio-criticism under the pseudonym Vl. Ilyin).

Before the revolution 

In January 1911, knyaz Evgeny Trubetskoy, along with a large group of professors, left Moscow University as a sign of disagreement with the government's violation of the principles of university autonomy. Ilyin moved to Western Europe (Heidelberg, Freiburg, Berlin, Göttingen and Paris) studying the latest trends in European philosophy, including philosophy of life and phenomenology influenced by Husserl, who concentrated on the ideal, essential structures of consciousness, Scheler, who published "The Nature of Sympathy", Fichte and Schelling on Absolute idealism. Meanwhile, Ilyin worked on his thesis "Crisis of rationalistic philosophy in Germany in the 19th century" which he never finished. In May 1912 he returned to work at the university and delivered a series of lectures called "Introduction to the Philosophy of Law". Novgorodtsev offered to have an Ilyin lecture on the theory of public law at the Moscow Commercial Institute.

In 1913 it seems, the couple broke with their relatives and met with Leo Tolstoy, according to Konstantin Krylov. He was known as being extremely intolerant towards Andrei Bely, who called Ilyin "mentally insane". For six weeks he and his wife paid visits to Sigmund Freud in 1914. During the July Crisis, he was forced to leave and his writings were confiscated at the outbreak of the First World War. After returning from Vienna, Ilyin was obsessed with psychoanalysis, diagnosing everything and everyone in Freudian terms, reducing every personal problem to neurotic symptoms, and according to one observer, psychoanalyzing every little gesture of those around him. The two became pioneers of the psychoanalytic movement in Russia. He began to develop a career as a writer and public figure.

World War I and the Russian Revolution 

  

After the breakout of World War I, Evgeny Trubetskoy, once a member of the Party of Peaceful Renovation, arranged a series of public lectures devoted to the "ideology of war". Ilyin contributed to this with several lectures, the first of which was called "The Spiritual Meaning of the War" (1915). He  believed that since Russia had already been involved in the war, the duty of every Russian was to support his country to the end. During the April Crisis (1917) he agreed with the Kadet Minister of Foreign Affairs Pavel Milyukov who staunchly opposed Petrograd Soviet demands for peace at any cost.   In the summer of 1917, he published the pamphlets "The Party program and maximalism", "On the term of convocation of the Constituent Assembly", "Order or disorder?", "Demagogy and provocation", and "Why not continue the war?" 

At first, Ilyin perceived the February Revolution as the liberation of the people. Along with many other intellectuals, he generally approved of it and supported the Russian Provisional Government. However, he was gradually disappointed and by the time the October Revolution has been complete, viewed it as a catastrophe. The Moscow State Conference convened by Kerensky's Second Government  was attended by actual and former Duma members, representatives of all major political parties, commercial and industrial organizations, the unions, army and academic institutions.  Ilyin warned the audience, about 2,600 people, "The revolution turned into self-interested plundering of the state". In the autumn, he wrote under the pseudonym Justus "Where is revolutionary democracy going?", "Mr. Kerensky's refusal", "What to expect?", "Nightmare", and "Who are they?" 

In February 1918 Ilyin gave a public lecture on patriotism: the lack among the Russian people of a mature legal consciousness. In March the Treaty of Brest-Litovsk was signed. In April Ilyin was arrested and accused of financially supporting a voluntary army in Moscow and having visited Andrey Avinoff, supporting the Imperial Army. The case was initiated by Felix Dzerzhinsky. The money he had received, Ilyin said, was destined for publishing: "The Philosophy of Hegel as a Doctrine of the Concreteness of God and Humanity". He was in the Butyrka prison dungeons for about a week but got serious problems with his health; Ilyin seems to have suffered from bronchitis and needed regular treatment. He was released for lack of evidence and allowed to give lectures and defend his thesis. For three weeks Ilyin was laying in bed; Novgorodtsev's apartment was searched on the eve of the defence.  On 19 May, Ilyin received two degrees at once. However, the publisher Lehman-Abrikosov made a broad gesture and offered to publish the two-volume book for free – so Ilyin returned the money to the sponsor Bary & Co. This two-volume dissertation (a provocative interpretation of Hegel) published in the revolutionary chaos of 1918, is considered one of the best commentaries on Hegel's philosophy, not only by Vladimir Lenin. He was an opponent of the Russian spelling reform of 1918 and stuck to the old fashioned spelling.

Ilyin became a professor of law in Moscow University.  As was customary among Russian religious thinkers, he lectured at the Moscow higher women's courses. He was imprisoned between 11-24 August, but released with the help of Ivan Yakovlev's son. On 19 December,  Ilyin received a summons to appear at a meeting of the Revolutionary Tribunal (non-recognition of Soviet power). In 1919 Ilyin wrote: "In Moscow, the winter is fierce, there is no firewood, we are hungry. They have already taken me to Cheka three times – and tried in a tribunal "for preparing an armed uprising". The ability to hate, despise, insult ideological opponents was particularly pronounced.  Ilyin was again imprisoned in 1919, February 1920 and September 1922 for alleged anti-communist activity. He, along with many other "irreconcilable" anti-Bolshevik intellectuals, was condemned to execution, and then forcibly exiled. On 29 September some 160 prominent intellectuals and their families were expelled (at their own expense and not allowed to return without the permission of the Soviet authorities) on a so-called "philosophers' ship" from Petrograd to Stettin, where they arrived on 2 October.

Emigration 

 

The Treaty of Rapallo (1922) between the German Republic and Soviet Russia opened friendly diplomatic relations. In February 1923, the Russian Scientific Institute (RSI) was founded in Berlin; funded by the YMCA. Ilyin delivered a topical speech "Problems of Modern Legal Consciousness". The RSI wasn't an educational institute; there were occasional lectures on Russian history, literature, law and other areas of Russian culture in Schinkel's Bauakademie. In 1923 Wrangel contacted Ilyin in the hope of arranging enrolment in the Institution for "about 300 of young Russian men ...". In July he lost his Russian citizenship for anti-Soviet activities abroad. It was the notorious year of hyperinflation in the Weimar Republic in October and the failed Beer Hall Putsch in November. The institute was going through a severe financial crisis. Due to invitations from the Czech government and offers from American universities, the number of employees soon thinned significantly. Ilyin briefly cooperated with Nikolai Berdyaev on Russian Religious Renaissance but the philosopher of love, moved to Paris and Novgorodtsev to Prague. In 1924, the Russian All-Military Union was founded; Ilyin met Pyotr Wrangel at Seeon Abbey, a center of anti-Bolshevik activities.  Wrangel was told to abandon his (military) adventures. Ilyin became part of Wrangel's inner circle; not every Russian was charmed by Wrangel's personality. 

In July 1924 Ilyin visited Italy for his health; his portrait of Benito Mussolini was sympathetic but not uncritical.

 

In his book On resisting evil by force (1925) Ilyin advocated the use of violence in the struggle against Bolshevism, which he regarded as despotism or "left totalitarianism". Ilyin argued that war was sometimes necessary, but never 'just'. Far from supporting holy war, Ilyin in fact wrote that "all my research proves that the sword is not 'holy' and not 'just'." He criticized anarchist ideology of Tolstoy and pacifist tolstoyism.  Ilyin called for the courage to "arrest, condemn, and shoot," which Maxim Gorky called a "gospel of revenge" and Berdyaev compared to a "Cheka of God" and "legalism devoid of grace". For Zinaida Gippius his book was "military field theology"; according to her "this is not a philosopher who writes books, not a publicist who writes feuilletons: it's a man possessed running amok." The book divided the Russian Émigrés; it contains a dedication to veterans of the White movement. In 1926 he bitterly wrote about the loss of the Motherland. Ilyin became the unofficial ideologue of the White émigrés who gathered in Paris. Between 1927 and 1930 Ilyin was a publisher and editor of the journal Russkiy Kolokol. He actively published in right-wing conservative newspapers. 

During the 1920s more than 300,000 Russians lived in Berlin. There were three daily newspapers and five weeklies. Seventeen Russian publishing houses had sprung up within a single year. Ilyin lectured in Germany and other European countries and would give 200 speeches. In 1930 the National Alliance of Russian Solidarists was founded in Belgrade and became popular in France. (It rejected both Bolshevism and liberal capitalism and embraced Russian patriotism.) 

In 1932 about only 60,000 Russian emigrants were living in Germany; the Berlin colony numbered 8,320 people. The activity of the RSI gradually slowed down due to a decrease in the number of Russian-speaking students. There were difficulties in maintaining this large institution, and it was liquidated. It became impossible to be employed as either a writer or a lecturer.

1933 Hitler's first year in office 

On 27 February, the Reichstag building was set on fire. Göring blamed a communist plot. The Reichstag Fire Decree on  the next day restricted the rights of personal freedom, and freedom of expression, including the freedom of the press, the freedom to organize and assemble, the privacy of postal, telegraphic and telephonic communications. Shortly after the fire, a wave of arrests began about 1500 people – Communists, in particular, were affected.  

On 7 April  the Law for the Restoration of the Professional Civil Service required an Aryan certificate from all employees and officials in the public sector, including education. On 11 April, Ilyin handed the Ministry of Internal Affairs a voluminous work entitled "Directives of the Comintern for the Bolshevisation of Germany," consisting of hundreds of excerpts from Comintern documents that had been published in the press. It looks like an attempt to curtsey the authorities according to A.F. Kiselyov. Ilyin confessed that he literally forced himself to read Lenin's works, the materials of party congresses and plenums, the Comintern, and the Soviet press.
In April Ilyin had a short, lukewarm communication with young Russian National Socialists. On 2 May, a committee  was founded with Ilyin on its presidium, though cooperation never took off since Ilyin scorned the Russian radicals. On 17 May Ilyin published in "Vozrojdénie" his infamous article "National Socialism. A New Spirit".  In June, Ilyin took over the head of the Russian Scientific Institute.  His friend Werner von Alvensleben was somehow involved in a putsch, which ended in the Night of the Long Knives. 

 

On 5 August, Ilyin's house was searched, his letters were looked over, and he himself was taken away for interrogation, where he was asked about his source of income and for details of the people abroad with whom he corresponded. After the questioning, he was released, although required to sign a declaration. In September the Reichskulturkammer was created with additional sub-chambers for the fields of broadcasting, fine arts, literature, music, the press, and the theatre. The Russian institute was placed under the Reich Ministry of Propaganda headed by Joseph Goebbels.  Adolf Ehrt who headed the organization Anti-Komintern, recruited Ilyin, Vonsiatsky and Kazembek, the leader of the Mladorossi, to work with him. 

On the opening of the reorganized institute  Ilyin reported on the plans of the Communist International to conquer the world; he helt a lecture on the work of Ivan Bunin who had won the Nobel Prize for Literature.  In an anonymous pamphlet Ilyin was accused of being a Freemason. He speeched on "The World Crisis of Democracy" and lectured on the works of Remizov and Merezhkovsky.  On 9 July he was fired when Erth demanded that the professors of the Russian Scientific Institute join in Nazi propaganda. Ilyin denounced the  racial policy of Nazi Germany and replied in a letter he long wanted to retire and devote himself to science. Ilyin was paid for the work he had done but from August he was without salary.  Many artists and intellectuals left Germany in the pre-war years rather than work under these restrictions.

In 1935, Ilyin spent much of the summer at a large dacha in rural Latvia that the artist Evgeny Klimov had rented. Under the (German-sounding) pseudonym Alfred Norman, he published "The Bolshevik Policy of World Domination." This is more or less Ilyin's last active political statement. He goes on to print essays in the Berliner Kurier. Vasily Shulgin, a nationalist, showed him his manuscript "The Orion Belt" on an alliance between Russia and Germany but Ilyin wasn't impressed. In 1936, Hitler put Vasily Biskupsky in charge of the Russische Vertrauensstelle, a government body dealing with the Russian émigré community. Ilyin actively criticized in the press Alexander Lvovich Kazembek, a fascist or self-styled neo-monarchist. In his speech in Riga in February 1937, dedicated to the 100th anniversary of Pushkin's death, Ilyin praised Pushkin's genius and defined his work as "the main entrance to Russian culture".   He applied for membership of the Reich Chamber of literature but he had a problem with obtaining an Aryan certificate knowing all his great-grandparents. Erth interfered and Ilyin received his membership. 

In his pamphlet "An attack on the Orthodox church" (1937) he accused Nietzsche of fuelling Bolshevism, and Stalinism. The Gestapo confiscated this work and banned him from the Reichskulturkammer and independent political activity.  Ilyin decided it was the time to leave, but the Berlin police forbade his departure. "On June 17, 1938, [he declared] I am ready to testify under oath that I and my wife are the purest Aryans and that I have never belonged to Masonic or affiliated organizations anywhere." Not long after he went to Münich and with a Nansen passport he visited a congress in Locarno. He asked the Swiss authorities to allow him to settle as a scientist, a philosopher and promote his theory on art. With financial help from Sergei Rachmaninoff, he was able to pay the bail, but he was not allowed to work or to interfere in any way with Swiss politics.

Switzerland 

From 1940 Ilyin resided stateless in the village of Zollikon near Lake Zürich and corresponded with the composer and pianist Nikolai Medtner. He published in local newspapers and lectured Russian literature at folk high schools, which was not considered work.  There was no danger from Ilyin's lectures, according to an expert opinion issued by the Swiss Army Command in 1942. They were "national in the sense that it is directed against the whole of the West". In November 1943 he refused to cooperate with the Russian Liberation Army. In 1946 Ilyin stated he was never a Hegelian, as he himself expressed in the introduction to the German translation of his theses, a revised version of "Die Philosophie Hegels als kontemplative Gotteslehre". In 1949 he and his wife received permanent citizenship. In his 1950 essay, "What Dismemberment of Russia Entails for the World", Ilyin predicted the fall of the Soviet Union and gave instructions on how to save Russia from the evils of the Western world. 

At the end of his life, Ivan Alexandrovich managed to finish and publish a work on which he worked for more than 33 years Axioms of Religious Experience, and  three volumes of philosophical and literary prose, originally written in German. He suddenly died in a hospital on 21 December 1954. In 1956, his postwar articles were compiled into a two-volume anthology called Our Tasks. These short political essays (in a verbose and pious style) were not only very profound, but also truly prophetic. It is about the future of Russia and its State, once freed of Communism. He did not describe this future very clearly, it is something bright, good, but blurry, according to the literary critic Alexander N. Arkhangelsky.

Family 

The Ilyins owned a dairy farm, 260 km from Moscow, in Bolshye Polyany (Ryazan Governorate) where they spent the summers. He had four brothers Alexey, Alexander, Julius, and Igor. In 1905 Alexey joined the Socialist Revolutionary Party but died in 1913. Alexander was a zemstvo warden but moved to America before the revolution. Igor, a lawyer, was arrested on charges of "counter-revolutionary agitation" by Stalin's NKVD in the Moscow region. He was executed and buried at Butovo firing range. In 1938/1955 his wife N.N. Ilyina published "The Expulsion of the Normans from Russian history". Her father was Julius Schweikert (1807-1876) a German physician and pioneer of homeopathy, who moved from Wittenberg to Moscow in 1832 and appointed in the Table of Ranks. His cousin Mikhail Ilyin was an art historian, involved in the design of Dobryninskaya, a Moscow metro station.

Political writings 

In exile, Ivan Ilyin argued that Russia should not be judged by what he called the Communist danger it represented at that time but looked forward to a future in which it would liberate itself with the help of  Christian fascism. (Already according to Machiavelli: religious zeal must necessarily be combined with patriotism.) Starting from his 1918 thesis on Hegel's philosophy, he authored many books on political, social and spiritual topics on the historical mission of Russia. One of the problems he worked on was the question: what eventually led Russia to the tragedy of the revolution? He answered that the reason was "the weak, damaged spiritual self-esteem" of Russians.

As a result, mutual distrust and suspicion between the state and the people emerged. The authorities and nobility constantly misused their power, subverting the unity of the people. Ilyin thought that any state must be established as a corporation in which a citizen is a member with certain rights and certain duties. Therefore, Ilyin recognized the inequality of people as a necessary state of affairs in any country. But that meant that educated upper classes had a special duty of spiritual guidance towards uneducated lower classes. This did not happen in Russia.

The other point was the wrong attitude towards private property among common people in Russia. Ilyin wrote that many Russians believed that private property and large estates are gained not through hard labor but through power and maladministration of officials. Therefore, the property becomes associated with dishonest behavior.

Monarchism and the concept of legal consciousness 

The key concept of Ilyin's legal philosophy was legal consciousness (правосозна́ние, pravosoznanie) which he understood as an ability of an individual and of the society as a whole to respect the law and to obey it willingly, to defer the authority and other citizens. Ilyin derived the concept of law from the Hegelian idea of the spirit and asserted that:

Legal consciousness, therefore, is "already given in embryo to each person". Positive law, then, is a way to shape transcendental norms of law present in legal consciousness. Ilyin distinguishes between a "correct" legal consciousness based on conservatism, morality and religion and a "formalist" legal consciousness that considers only the posited, rationalized law and, therefore, gives no clues to understanding what law is. According to Ilyin, mature legal consciousness is always rooted in Christian ethics and monarchism, the monarchy being the natural realization of the Divine providence. Monarchic legal consciousness tends to perceive the state as a family and unite the citizens with family bonds while the monarch becomes not only legal but also a spiritual ruler. His ideal was the monarch who would rule for the good of the country, would not belong to any party and would embody the union of all people, whatever their beliefs are. To serve this monarch is not an act of submission but rather of conscious and free choice of a responsible citizen. To the contrary, the republican legal consciousness praises individual freedom, social climbing and disregard for authority and is eager for radical changes. People view the state not as a family, but rather as a danger that needs to be contained with checks and balances. Democratic elections, according to Ilyin, tend to elevate sneaky and evasive politicians.  Ilyin repeatedly condemned the totalitarian state and emphasized the need to develop a form of 'legal consciousness' among the population. In his 1949 article, Ilyin argued against both totalitarianism and "formal" democracy in favor of a "third way" of building a state in Russia: "Facing this creative task, appeals of foreign parties to formal democracy remain naive, light-minded and irresponsible."

Ilyin didn't finish his work on monarchy, using Hegel's concept of world history. He wrote that each nation has its own unique, organic path of self-preservation. Ilyin praised the Russian monarchy of the XIX century which he deemed consistent with his ideas and not absolute but essentially limited by religious and moral norms, and criticized Nicholas II for his abdication, eventually leading to the abolition of monarchy in Russia.  On Monarchy and Republic was supposed to consist of twelve chapters but Ilyin died having written the introduction and seven chapters which were published in 1978.

Paul Valliere wrote, Ilyin can certainly be exonerated of the charge that he proposed to induce virtue by force, like Tomás de Torquemada or Robespierre. He explicitly rejected this idea. He can also be exonerated of the charge of advocating holy war, although his position bears a resemblance to holy war in certain respects.

Ilyin elaborated these views in writings that were eventually published posthumously.   On the Essence of Legal Consciousness was written between 1916 and 1918 under the influence of the writings of Novgorodtsev and Bogdan Kistyakovski and published in 1956.

Eurasianism 
Drawing on historical, geographical, ethnographical, linguistic, musicological and religious studies, the Eurasianists suggested that the lands of the Russian Empire, and then of the Soviet Union, formed a natural unity, making Russia a distinct civilization, neither European nor Asian but Eurasian, according to Paul Robinson. A key feature of Eurasianism is the rejection of Russian ethnic nationalism that seeks a purely Slavic state. Aversion to democracy is an important characteristic of Eurasianism.  Unlike many of the white Russians, the Eurasianists rejected all hope for a restoration of the monarchy. One of the key figures was Nikolai Trubetzkoy. Another participant was Vladimir Nikolaevich Ilyin (1890-1974), a philosopher, theologian and composer from Kyiv. The latter seems not related to Ivan A. Ilyin who has been presented in the literature by various authors as belonging to the group. The first Eurasianists were mostly pacifist Émigres, and their vision of the future had features of romanticism and utopianism. The goal of the Eurasianists was the unification of the main Christian churches under the leadership of the Russian Orthodox Church. 

 In March 1922 Lenin insisted on a final and speedy reprisal against the Russian Orthodox Church, which was considered a hotbed of internal "counter-revolution". The Politburo sought to remove Buddhism and other religions, as they believed that a lack of religion (State atheism) combined with urbanization would result in an increase in production. In April 1925 League of Militant Atheists was formed under the ideology of the communist Party.

In October 1925 the Eurasianists held a congress in Prague with the intention of creating a seminar. In the late 1920s, Eurasianists polarized and became divided into two groups, the left Eurasianists, who were becoming increasingly pro-Soviet and pro-communist  and the classic right Eurasianists, who remained staunchly anti-communist and anti-Soviet. The Eurasianists faded quickly from the Russian émigré community; N. Trubetzkoy and V.N. Ilyin left. For Ivan Ilyin, however, eurasianism was "mental subterfuge".

Ukraine 
Ilyin's chauvinistic views on Ukraine were typical of Russian White émigrés. Unlike Alfred Rosenberg, who was in favor of collaboration with the East Slavs against Bolshevism and offered them national independence, Ukrainian independence was anathema to him. In 1934, Ilyin stated he was "in no way sympathetic to either conversations or plans for the separation of Ukraine".  He saw it as one of the reasons he lost his job at the institute. 

In 1938, in a small but significant article, Ilyin wrote: "Little Russia and Great Russia are bound together by faith, tribe, historical destiny, geographical location, economy, culture and politics", and predicted: "History has not yet said its last word". 

Ilyin disputed that an individual could choose their nationality any more than cells can decide whether they are part of a body. What Snyder actually said: "Social advancement was impossible because the political system, the social system, is like a body… you have a place in this body. Freedom means knowing your place."

View on fascism 
His 1928 article On Russian Fascism is about the fascist "method" of dealing with the Bolshevik plague.  Fascism is the Italian secular variation of the white movement. The Russian white movement is "more perfect" than fascism due to its religious component." Ilyin looked at Mussolini and Hitler as exemplary leaders who were saving Europe by dissolving democracy. 

On 17 May 1933, Ilyin published in the Paris newspaper "Vozrojdénie" an infamous article titled "National Socialism. A New Spirit" in support of the takeover of Germany by Nazis, in which he accused Berliner Tageblatt, the Vossische Zeitung, and the Frankfurter Zeitung of being pro-Bolshevik newspapers. (Recently the Nazi book burnings had taken place.) Ilyin bitterly attacked the "Jewish bourgeois press" of Weimar Germany, which he accused of being pro-Soviet and never telling the truth about Russia. 
 
 

In September the Reich Chamber of Culture was established. When the Berlin Institute was placed under Reich Ministry of Public Enlightenment and Propaganda in October not only the Jews but also Ilyin lost his job as head of the institute because of he refused to incorporate Nazi propaganda into his courses. Ilyin noted the Nazi government's assault on the civil rights of German Jews but did not regard those measures as a sufficient reason for calling the entire German fascist project into question. When he was asked to join the anti-Jewish propaganda Ilyin refrained from following it. This was followed by a ban on teaching activities. After that, he was arrested for all his printed works and completely banned from public speaking. The initial support proved to be short-lived: he had fallen victim to Émigré denunciations, which prompted the search of his house by police and subsequent interrogation. In a letter to Ivan Shmelyov, dated 7 August 1934, Ilyin wrote: "At the beginning of July, I was dismissed along with all my other compatriots from the position I had occupied for 12 years — dismissed for being Russian patriot. 

Ilyin initially saw Adolf Hitler as a defender of civilization from Bolshevism and approved of the way Hitler had, in his view, derived his anti-communism and antisemitism from the ideology of the Russian Whites.  Ilyin's admiration for early fascism, his arguments for a strong state, organically connected to the people, and his assertion that at the head of the state, there must be a single will have inevitably produced comparisons with his German counterpart Carl Schmitt. 

In 1948, Ilyin in his work "On Fascism" gives a series of justifications for fascism and sums it up at the end of his work:

He wrote in "On Fascism":

A number of Ilyin's works (including those written after the Italian and German defeats in 1945) advocated fascism. "Italian fascism expressed in its own, Roman way the things that Russia had for centuries been standing on," he wrote in 1948. A year later Roman Gul accused Ilyin of antisemitism: "I still have among the clippings your pro-Hitler article where you recommend the Russians not to look at Hitlerism "through the eyes of Jews" and sing the praises of this movement!" Ilyin would describe Nazis as those who had "walked the path of Anti-Christ." 

According to Timothy D. Snyder, Ilyin's ideas are a hodgepodge of German idealism, psychoanalysis, Italian fascism, and Christianity. Some of his work has a rambling and commonsensical character, and it is easy to find tensions and contradictions. Attempts to identify him as 'Putin's philosopher' by citing selective quotations from Ilyin are usually misleading.

Paul Valliere, professor of Religion, at Butler University, wrote "Like Hegel, Ilyin was a statist and a monarchist, but to deny that liberal values occupied a central place in his political thought is a mistake. For the same reason, it is a mistake to call Ilyin a "fascist philosopher." Ilyin's thought never manifested such signal features of fascism as populism, totalitarianism, racism, anti-Semitism, thuggery, or the politics of hysteria. One may criticize Ilyin severely for not recognizing the catastrophic vices of fascism from the start." After the attack on Milyukov and Nabokov in 1922 he warned Struve against the extreme Markov.

Paul Robinson (University of Ottawa Faculty of Social Sciences), the author of the book "Russian Conservatism", points out if you want to find a fascist Ilyin, you can. But if you want to find a liberal one, you can do that too. Ilyin considered that fascism had some positive characteristics, as well as some negative ones, but to be a Western European ideology and as such inappropriate for Russia.

Contemporary German philosophers
According to Wolfgang Eilenberger, the author of "Time of the Magicians: The Great Decade of Philosophy, 1919-1929" at least three contemporary philosophers didn't believe in parliamentary democracy during the Weimar Republic: 
Martin Heidegger, the former lover of Hannah Arendt, joined the Nazi Party (NSDAP) on May 1, 1933, ten days after being elected rector of the University of Freiburg. A year later, in April 1934, he resigned from the rectorship and stopped taking part in party meetings, but remained a member of the Nazi Party until its dismantling at the end of World War II. 

 
Walter Benjamin criticized the Weimar Republic, liberal democracy in general, and the entire project of the enlightenment.
Ludwig Wittgenstein (who had been a classmate of Hitler in Linz in 1903/4) was a monarchist in his early years, and never wrote about justice, equality, war, or any other classically political subject. He shared Spengler's cultural pessimism.
 Oswald Spengler's ideas were undermining the Weimar Republic: anti-democratic, anti-liberal. At the same time, he was not a Nazi.
 The controversial philosopher and jurist Carl Schmitt who joined the Nazi party on the same day as Heidegger presented his theories as an ideological foundation of the Nazi dictatorship and a justification of the Führer state concerning legal philosophy, particularly through the concept of auctoritas.

Influence 

The Ilyins had no children and in 1954 Ilyin expressed the hope that his books would be saved from destruction.  Having been taught a severe personal lesson by having his Hegel dissertation manuscript, notes, and materials confiscated in Austria at the outbreak of the First World War (July Crisis), which then had to be rewritten or reconstructed, all the evidence suggests that Ilyin took care to retain and preserve his papers and his books for posterity. Following the death of Ilyin's wife in 1963, Ilyin scholar Nikolai Poltoratzky had Ilyin's manuscripts and papers brought from Zurich to Michigan State University, where he was a professor of the Russian language. 
 The Archive would not be sold to nor bestowed upon Michigan State University, but would be provided to the University for temporary use;
 After the liquidation of the Communist regime in Russia, the Archive should be transferred to Moscow University.

In the USSR, Ilyin was hardly mentioned openly, but his works began to be published in 1988 during glasnost. Sometimes his name is surprisingly absent from descriptions of events in which Ilyin was an active participant, or his role is not considered in enough detail. 

In Russia's political culture today, Ilyin enjoys popularity among nationalists and authoritarians who admire his emphatic patriotism and his calls for strong state power in Russia. Ilyin's views influenced Aleksandr Solzhenitsyn and Aleksandr Dugin, facing the dissolution of the Soviet Union. Brilliant analyses and forecasts of Ilyin made some of Russian scientists think that it was necessary to research the methodological basis of Ilyin's analyses and his curriculum vitae. As of 2005, 23 volumes of Ilyin's collected works have been published in Russia. 

The Russian filmmaker Nikita Mikhalkov, in particular, was instrumental in propagating Ilyin's ideas in post-Soviet Russia. He authored several articles about Ilyin and came up with the idea of transferring his remains from Switzerland to the Donskoy Monastery in Moscow, where the philosopher had dreamed to find his last retreat. The ceremony of reburial, also of Anton Denikin, a general whose slogan was Russia, One and Indivisible was held on 3 October 2005. The Russian Cultural Foundation, founded by Raisa Gorbacheva and affiliated with the Russian Ministry of Culture, formally requested that the papers be returned to Russia. In May 2006, and with the financial help of Viktor Vekselberg the MSU transferred Ilyin's papers and books to the Scientific Library of the Lomonosov Moscow State University. In 2007 the CIA published a treatise on him. In April 2008, a memorial plaque of the graduate and teacher was installed on the oldest building of the Moscow State University at Mokhovaya Street. In June 2012, a monument - cast from meteorite iron - was unveiled in Yekaterinburg.

Ilyin has been quoted by Russian President Vladimir Putin in his speeches on various occasions, and is considered by some observers to be a major ideological inspiration for Putin. Putin decreed moving Ilyin's remains back to Russia, and in 2009 consecrated his grave. At Russian New Year 2014, all high-ranking bureaucrats and local government officials were sent a copy of "Our Tasks", a work by Nikolai Berdyaev and Vladimir Solovyov. He was quoted or mentioned by Dmitry Medvedev, Sergey Lavrov, Patriarch Kirill of Moscow, Vladislav Surkov, and Vladimir Ustinov. On 30 September 2022, Putin gave a speech on the Russian annexation of four territories in Ukraine, where he quoted Ilyin.

Major works 

Under Lenin, all of Ilyin's works were removed from libraries and destroyed; under Stalin, readers of his material were shot for reading and distributing his works; under Khrushchev and Brezhnev, they were imprisoned.
 Hegel's philosophy as a doctrine of the concreteness of God and man (Философия Гегеля как учение о конкретности Бога и человека, 2 vols., 1918; German: Die Philosophie Hegels als kontemplative Gotteslehre, 1946)
 Resistance to Evil By Force (О сопротивлениии злу силою, 1925)
 The Way of Spiritual Revival (1935)
 Foundations of Struggle for the National Russia (1938)
 The Basis of Christian Culture (Основы христианской культуры, 1938)
 About the Future Russia (1948)
 Axioms of Religious Experience (Аксиомы религиозного опыта, 2 volumes, 1953)
 On the Essence of Conscience of Law (О сущности правосознания, 1956)
 The Way to Insight (Путь к очевидности, 1957)
 The Singing Heart. The Book of Silent Contemplation 1958 
 On Monarchy and Republic (О монархии и республики, 1978)
 Our Tasks (1948-1954). First published in Paris in 1956. In 1991, another edition of "Our Tasks" was published in Jordanville (USA), carried out by N.P. Poltoratsky.

See also 
  Ilyin, played by Kirill Pirogov, appears in a key episode of the Trotsky (TV series).
 Orthodoxy, Autocracy and Nationality
 Russian philosophy
 Alexandre Kojève
 Rashism
 Putinism

References

Notes

Further reading 
 On the Essence of Legal Consciousness, Second Revised Edition. Ivan Aleksandrovich Il'in. Edited, Introduced, and Translated by: William E. Butler, Philip T. Grier and Paul Robinson 2023 ISBN 9781616196790
 Philip T. Grier (1994) The Complex Legacy of Ivan Il'in, p. 165-182. In: Russian Thought After Communism: The Recovery of a Philosophical Heritage edited by James Patrick Scanlan
 History of Russian Philosophy «История российской Философии» (1951) by N.O. Lossky. Publisher: Allen & Unwin, London ASIN: B000H45QTY International Universities Press, Inc. New York, New York, USA.  sponsored by Saint Vladimir's Orthodox Theological Seminary.
 Putins brauner Philosoph by Robert Misik. In: Falter, 11 April 2022
 Bibliography on Russian Wikipedia
 Laruelle, M. (2022) Is Russia Fascist?: A Response to Yoshiko Herrera, Mitchell Orenstein, and Anton Shekhovtsov. Nationalities Papers, 1-4. https://doi.org/10.1017/nps.2022.82
 Laruelle, M. (2018) Is Russia Really "Fascist"? A Comment on Timothy Snyder
 Zakhartsev S.I. (2021) The Victory Day in the Great Patriotic War: What the Biography of the Philosopher I.A. Ilyin Hides // Russian Journal of Legal Studies (Moscow). Vol. 8. - N. 2. - P. 95-102. doi: 10.17816/RJLS66471

External links
 Ilyin: exile and patriot Life and creative history Special project of the portal "Culture.Russian Federation" tells about the biography of Ilyin, his scientific works and the return of his archive to Russia.
 Testament of the Philosopher Ilyin (2005) is a documentary by Alexey Denisov
 Three speeches by Ilyin
 New York Times on Ilyin's reburial

1883 births
Rurikids
Moscow State University alumni
People from Moskovsky Uyezd
Writers from Moscow
Russian monarchists
Russian anti-communists
Russian All-Military Union members
Slavophiles
Soviet expellees
White Russian emigrants to Germany
Emigrants from the Russian Empire to Germany
White Russian emigrants to Switzerland
Emigrants from the Russian Empire to Switzerland
20th-century Russian philosophers
Conservatism in Russia
Russian fascists
Russian nationalists
1954 deaths
Burials at Donskoye Cemetery